Eric Reginald "Reg" Holland (23 January 1940 – 3 January 2019) was an English footballer who played as a full back.

Playing career
Holland enjoyed a promising start to his football career by being selected to play for England Schoolboys and England Youth while twice winning the FA Youth Cup with Manchester United. Despite captaining the club's reserve side, Holland never made a league appearance at Old Trafford although he was an unused substitute on three occasions.

In March 1960, he moved to Wrexham for £2,000, going on to spend six years with the North Wales side before joining local rivals Chester in March 1966. After six league appearances he dropped into Non-League football with Altrincham.

After retiring from football, he joined the Staffordshire Police and spent 27 years with the force before retiring in 1994.

Holland died on 3 January 2019 at the age of 78.

Honours
Manchester United
 FA Youth Cup (2): 1955–56, 1956–57

References

1940 births
2019 deaths
Sportspeople from Sutton-in-Ashfield
Footballers from Nottinghamshire
English footballers
Association football fullbacks
Manchester United F.C. players
Wrexham A.F.C. players
Chester City F.C. players
Altrincham F.C. players
English Football League players